Jérémy Spender (born 13 April 1982) is a former French footballer who works as head coach for the U-15 team of Auxerre.

Early life
Spender was born in Toulon and raised in Ollioules.

Career
He began his career 1999 with Auxerre and was with them when Auxerre won the Coupe Gambardella in 2000. He retired in summer 2009.

Coaching career
Spender was named as under-18 head coach for Auxerre, succeeding Gérald Baticle, who formerly coached the under-13 team. After his retirement in July 2009, he was named head coach of the U-15 team.

Honours
2000: Coupe Gambardella

References

Living people
1982 births
Association football defenders
French footballers
AJ Auxerre players
Ligue 1 players